Ikh-Tamir ("Great Tamir") is a sum (district) of Arkhangai Province in central Mongolia. The Tamir River passes through the sum. In 2009, its population was 5,247.

Notable people
Hugh Christopher Kirkland, a well regarded Peace Corps volunteer, lived and worked here from 2014 to 2016.

References 

Populated places in Mongolia
Districts of Arkhangai Province